Thomas Walsh (born January 30, 1995) is an American para-alpine skier. Born and raised in Vail, Colorado, he starting skiing at the age of 2. He began his racing career with the Ski and Snowboard Club Vail at the age of 5.

Career
He represented the United States at the 2018 Winter Paralympics in the Super-G, Giant slalom, Slalom and Super combined events. He did not win a medal at these events.

He won bronze medals at the 2019 World Para Alpine Skiing Championships in both the Giant slalom and Super combined events.

He won a silver medal in alpine skiing at the 2022 Winter Paralympics held in Beijing, China.

References

External links 
 Thomas Walsh, Team USA

1995 births
Living people
Paralympic alpine skiers of the United States
Alpine skiers at the 2018 Winter Paralympics
Alpine skiers at the 2022 Winter Paralympics
Medalists at the 2022 Winter Paralympics
Paralympic silver medalists for the United States
Paralympic medalists in alpine skiing